The 2021–22 season was the 103rd season in the existence of Hamburger SV and the club's fourth consecutive season in the second division of German football. In addition to the domestic league, Hamburger SV participated in this season's edition of the DFB-Pokal.

Players

First-team squad

Out on loan

Transfers

In

Out

Pre-season and friendlies

Competitions

Overall record

2. Bundesliga

League table

Results summary

Results by round

Matches
The league fixtures were announced on 25 June 2021.

Promotion play-offs
As a result of their third place finish in the regular season, the club qualified for the play-off match with the 16th-place team in the 2021–22 Bundesliga to determine whether the club would be promoted to the 2022–23 Bundesliga.

DFB-Pokal

References

Hamburger SV seasons
Hamburger SV